Wonder Wheels is a Saturday morning animated series produced by Hanna-Barbera Productions that originally aired as a 5-minute segment on The Skatebirds from September 10, 1977, to January 21, 1978, on CBS.

In the fall of 1979, Wonder Wheels continued to air on The Skatebirds when the show returned to CBS in a shortened half-hour version on Sunday mornings until January 25, 1981. In the late 1980s, it resurfaced in a different syndicated half-hour version of The Skatebirds on USA Cartoon Express and later on Cartoon Network, Boomerang and as an interstitial segment between shows.

Plot
A 17-year-old high school journalist named Willie Wheeler (voiced by Micky Dolenz of The Monkees) and his girlfriend Dooley Lawrence (voiced by Susan Davis) solve crimes with the help of his superhero motorcycle Wonder Wheels. Whenever Willie goes into action, he utters his catchphrase: "This looks like a job for Won-won-won-won-won-won-won-won-won-won-won-won-wonder Wheels!" and at the press of a button, Willie's beat-up motorcycle transforms into a flashy version with a mind of its own.

Episodes

Voices
 Micky Dolenz – Willie Wheeler/Wonder Wheels
 Susan Davis – Dooley Lawrence

Production credits
 Executive Producers: William Hanna, Joseph Barbera
 Produced by: Terry Morse Jr.
 Creative Producer: Iwao Takamoto
 Associate Producer: Neil Balnaves
 Animation: Sue Speak, Cecil Collins, Rodney D'Silva, Dick Dunn, Peter Eastment, John Ellis, Warwick Gilbert, Gerald Grabner, Sebastian Hurpia, Greg Ingram, Richard Jones, Cynthia Leech, Paul McAdam, Henry Neville, Ray Nowland, Di Rudder, Michael Stapleton, John Tych, Kaye Watts
 Animation Directors: Charles A. Nichols, Chris Cuddington
 Assistant Animation Supervisor: Paul Maron
 Story: Kathy Colburn, Tom Dagenais, Dill Dailey, Dianne Dixon, Kari Oaurs, Andy Heyward, Chris Jenkyns, Mark Jones, Joan Maurer, Michael Maurer, Norman Maurer, Jack Mendelsohn, Howie Post, Cliff Roberts, Sandy Sandifer
 Story Editors: Norman Maurer, Sid Morse
 Story Direction: Alvaro Arce, Carl Fallberg, Cullen Houghtaling, Mike O'Connor, Don Sheppard, George Singer, Karren Wright
 Editors: Peter Berger, Warner Leighton, Peter Jennings
 Supervising Film Editor: Dick Elliott
 Assistant Film Editor: Barry Gold
 Recording Director: Wally Burr
 Graphics: Iraj Paran
 Musical Director: Hoyt Curtin
 Musical Supervision: Paul DeKorte
 Character Design: Bob Singer, Norman Maurer, Lew Ott, George Wheeler
 Layout Supervision: Steve Lumley
 Layout: Bob Fosbry, Terry Moesker, Joe Shearer, Mike Trebert
 Backgrounds: Richard Zaloudek, Milan Zahorsky, Jerry Liew, Michael King-Prince, Peter Connell, Ken Wright, Michael Chojecki, Lesley Nicholl
 Animation Checking: Narelle Nixon
 Xerography: Ellen Bayley
 Ink and Paint Supervision: Narelle Derrick
 Production Managers: R. J. Louis, James Cranston
 Production Coordinator: Tobi Singleton
 Production Supervision: Doug Patterson, Mark D'Arcy-Irvine, Adrienne Smith
 Art Director: Kirk Axtell
 Script Supervisors: Mary Jane Ferguson, Lester Hoyle
 Sound Direction: Richard Olson, Bill Getty
 Sound Mixers: Manuel Topoto, James Pilcher
 Animation Photography: Terry Smith, Carole Laird, Mark D'Arcy-Irvine, Kieren Mulgrew, Tom Epperson
 Dubbing Supervision: Pat Foley
 Negative Consultant: William E. DeBoer
 Post Production Supervision: Joed Eato

References

External links
 
 Wonder Wheels: Behind the Voice Actors

1977 American television series debuts
1977 American television series endings
1970s American animated television series
American children's animated comedy television series
American children's animated superhero television series
English-language television shows
CBS original programming
Fictional motorcycles
Teen animated television series
Teen superhero television series
Television series about shapeshifting
Television series by Hanna-Barbera
Hanna-Barbera superheroes
Hanna-Barbera characters